National Lucia Bride of Sweden (in Swedish: Sveriges Lucia) was a competition for Swedish females. The winner of the competition would be the "Lucia Bride" heading traditional Lucia processions on December 13, Saint Lucy's Day. The contest was usually held in churches or at the open-air museum Skansen in Stockholm. It was held between 1973 and 2012, and it was sponsored by the publications Året Runt and Stockholm City. Between 2001 and 2007, the competition was called either "Årets Lucia" (Lucia of the year) or "Stockholms Lucia" (Lucia of Stockholm).

Prior to 2008 the event was mainly a beauty contest, but from that year the sponsors wished to judge the contestants primarily by their responses during an interview with the competition's judges, and on their singing ability. Every contestant represented a Swedish charity organization.

Winners include Yvonne Ryding, titleholder of the 1983 contest, who became Miss Sweden and Miss Universe in following year.

Winners

References

External links
 Sveriges Lucia official website
 Lucia Bride of Sweden 2000
 Lucia Bride
 History of Santa Lucia, article by Christian historian Bill Petro exploring how missionaries introduced the Santa Lucia celebration to Sweden

Competitions in Sweden
Beauty pageants in Sweden